Paul Van den Berghe (born 7 January 1933 in Geraardsbergen, Belgium) is a Belgium Bishop in the Roman Catholic Church.

Biography
Van den Berghe obtained a degree in Thomist philosophy and was ordained a priest on 15 June 1957. He then earned a doctorate in theology in 1961 and became professor of exegesis at a seminary in Ghent, where he was one of the founders was the Hoger Instituut voor Godsdienstwetenschappen. He served as the editorial secretary of Collationes, a Flemish magazine of pastoral theology, and wrote numerous articles on the exegesis of the New Testament.

On 3 July 1980 he was appointed the 21st Bishop of Antwerp by Pope John Paul II (the third bishop of the re-established Diocese of Antwerp) and consecrated on 7 September 1980. His motto, chosen from a verse in the book of Galatians is: "Libertati liberavit nos" (For the freedom he set us free). In the Belgian bishops' conference he was responsible for the Interdiocesaan Pastoraal Beraad (Inter-Diocesan Pastoral Board).

In 2008, he had reached the mandatory retirement age of 75 and on 28 October 2008 he was succeeded by Bishop Johan Bonny.

References

1933 births
Living people
Bishops of Antwerp
20th-century Belgian Roman Catholic theologians
21st-century Roman Catholic bishops in Belgium
Bishops appointed by Pope John Paul II
20th-century Roman Catholic bishops in Belgium
People from Geraardsbergen